Pratap Raghunath Save (20 May 1945 – 20 April 2000), was a decorated Indian Army officer and a social activist. A member of a middle-class family in a coastal village of Deheri, Umargam. Save's father, Raghunath Save was a teacher and a freedom fighter. Young Save joined army in order to serve the nation. He later married Sunita Save.

Save served Indian Army for 25 years. After retirement from his job  he returned to his hometown. Save's death drawn nationwide attention to his work and his struggle.

Social Service
Save after his retirement, returned back to his home town. News regarding a mega port project  spread throughout the village. This scared the fisherman community of the village, port project risked their settlement. They approached Save to seek help, Save agreed to help the community. Kinara Sangarsh Samiti was formed with Save as its president. They began with peaceful protest against the project. Protest soon gathered the attention of the state government. Save was suddenly arrested at night by local police force. According to the villagers who were jailed too, Save was brutally beaten up by the police.

Death
Save was shifted to Hinduja Hospital, where he spent his last days unconsciously. On 20 April 2000 he was pronounced dead.

After his death, this issue gathered a nationwide attention resulting in abolishment of the port project.

See also
 Narmada Bachao Andolan
 Medha Patkar
 Bhaskar Save

References

1945 births
2000 deaths
Indian activists
Indian Army personnel